Ignacio 'Nacho' Rodríguez Ortiz (born 6 November 1982 in Laredo, Cantabria) is a Spanish professional footballer who plays as a forward.

External links

1982 births
Living people
People from Laredo, Cantabria
Spanish footballers
Footballers from Cantabria
Association football forwards
La Liga players
Segunda División players
Segunda División B players
Tercera División players
Divisiones Regionales de Fútbol players
Rayo Cantabria players
Racing de Santander players
Cultural Leonesa footballers
FC Cartagena footballers
CD Logroñés footballers
Real Oviedo players
CD Alcoyano footballers
Sestao River footballers
CD Guijuelo footballers
CD Mensajero players
Gimnástica de Torrelavega footballers
Austrian Football Bundesliga players
SV Ried players
Bolivian Primera División players
Universitario de Sucre footballers
Spain youth international footballers
Spanish expatriate footballers
Expatriate footballers in Austria
Expatriate footballers in Bolivia
Spanish expatriate sportspeople in Austria
Spanish expatriate sportspeople in Bolivia